Hank Moonjean (January 19, 1930 – October 7, 2012) was an American film producer, executive producer, and associate producer. His production credits included Dangerous Liaisons, Child's Play, and The Great Gatsby and several movies featuring Burt Reynolds. Moonjean and film producer Norma Heyman jointly received an Academy Award for Best Picture nomination for the 1988 dramatic film, Dangerous Liaisons.

Life and career
Moonjean, who was Armenian American, was born in Evanston, Illinois. He graduated from the University of Southern California (USC). Soon after graduation from USC, he answered an employment ad for an interpreter at MGM Studios, and later became an uncredited assistant director for the 1954 film, Bhowani Junction, directed by George Cukor. He worked for MGM for eight years. He became a second director for numerous MGM films while at the studio: Blackboard Jungle, The Prodigal, It's Always Fair Weather, Love Me or Leave Me, The Tender Trap, I'll Cry Tomorrow, A Catered Affair, Kismet, Tea and Sympathy and Raintree County.

Moonjean collaborated to produce or co-produce many films starring Burt Reynolds, including The End in 1978, Hooper in 1978, Smokey and the Bandit II in 1980, Paternity in 1981, Sharky's Machine in 1981, and Stroker Ace in 1983. In 1975, Moonjean was announced as producer of The Bryna Company film Something Wicked This Way Comes, when it was set to be distributed through Paramount Pictures, but he eventually left the project.

In 2008, Moonjean released his memoir, Bring In The Peacocks: Memoirs Of A Hollywood Producer. He also donated an extensive collection of film advertisements to the Academy of Motion Picture Arts and Sciences.

Hank Moonjean died from pancreatic cancer at his Hollywood Hills residence on October 7, 2012, at the age of 82. He was survived by his partner of 51 years, Bradley Bennett.

Filmography

Film

Assistant director

Miscellaneous crew

Production manager

Television

As writer

References

External links

1930 births
2012 deaths
American film directors
University of Southern California alumni
American people of Armenian descent
Deaths from pancreatic cancer
Deaths from cancer in California